is a 2000-year-old Japanese cedar (Cryptomeria) at Nakagawa Settlement, Yamakita town, Ashigarakami District, Kanagawa Prefecture, Japan.

The tree was revered by locals because it prevented a great fire from spreading in 1904. There is still visible fire damage on the tree. On July 12, 1972, it stopped a great landslide and lessened the damage during heavy rainfall in the Tanzawa Mountains.

It was designated as a national Natural Monument on March 26, 1934.

Measurements
Houkisugi at Nakagawa is estimated to be more than 2000 years old.

Etymology
There are two views about the origin of the term "Houki:" 1) The place was earlier called Houkizawa or 2) the tree is Japanese Broom shaped. Broom is Houki in Japanese.

History
In the Edo era, the felling of trees such as  cryptomeria, Chamaecyparis obtusa, Zelkova serrata, firs (Abies), Tsuga sieboldii, or Torreya nucifera was prohibited. After the Meiji Restoration, trees which were around the cryptomeria tree were cut down, and the area became a Japanese tea plantation. The local people held shinto ceremonies at the local guardian shrine called Suga Shrine on July 12 and October 13 (Festival) thanking the sacred tree. They cleaned the shrine every month. In the summer of 2003, a branch of the tree was broken but the tree was restored to health with the treatment by an arborist.

Recognition
In 1990, this tree was selected as one among the New Japan Noted 100 Trees by  Yomiuri Shimbun.
This tree was selected as one among the 100 Noted Trees in Kanagawa Prefecture.
In 2001, this tree was selected as one in Kanagawa Prefecture Future Heritage by Kanagawa Prefecture and Kanagawa Shimbun.

See also

 Jōmon Sugi
 Sacred Nagi Tree of Kumano Hayatama Taisha
 Great sugi of Kayano
 List of individual trees
 List of oldest trees

References

External links 
 Hirohaku Takahashi, I visited sacred trees - Pilgrimage of Mysterious and Sacred Big Trees, 2009, Tokyo Chizu Shuppan, 
Yomiuri Shimbun, New Noted 100 Trees in Japan 1990, Yomiuri Shimbun, 
Norihiro Watanabe Big Trees 1999, Yamato Keikoku Sha, 
Houki Sugi, Bunkachou website, article retrieved on February 10, 2012
Houkisugi Yamakitacho website, article retrieved on February 10, 2012]

Kanagawa Prefecture
Trees in religion
Individual conifers
Natural monuments of Japan
Individual trees in Japan
Oldest trees